San Juan Bay is the bay and main inlet adjacent to Old San Juan in northeastern Puerto Rico. The San Juan Bay is home to the island's busiest harbor and its history dates back to at least 1508.

Geography
The bay is a semi-enclosed body of water with an elaborate system of loops, basins and channels at the center of Puerto Rico's most significant historical monuments and largest communities. San Juan Bay provides recreation, sightseeing and tourist attractions, and its curved shape offers a variety of docking facilities for watercraft. Because of commercial expansion and environmental stress on the region, the estuary has been the focus of restoration ecology projects. In 2015, the San Juan Estuary Program (Programa del estuario de la Bahía de San Juan) began using green flags to mark the condition of the bay's waters.

On a map, San Juan Bay appears to connect two adjacent lakes. This impression comes from a neck of land, Puntilla ("small point"), which projects from the Islet of San Juan Bautista into the center of the bay and approaches another protuberance (Punta Cataño) stretching from the other side of a larger island. The illusion demonstrates the bay's irregular shape. Next to Puntilla are docks which are reportedly the busiest in the Caribbean. Part of the Port of San Juan, they are on the Islet of San Juan Bautista at the entrance to San António Channel. Three bridges between the islet and the mainland cross the channel, which connects the bay to Laguna del Condado (Condado Lagoon) and the Atlantic Ocean. One of these bridges is the historic Dos Hermanos Bridge. Before their construction, the Condado Lagoon was the bay's narrowest entrance.

On the other side, across the Isla Grande peninsula, the bay's interior is shaped like a triangle. It contains the busy Bahía de Puerto Nuevo (New Port Bay), which is closer to inland transportation networks than the Port of San Juan. The bay is fed by the Río Piedras, which empties into the bay via the Canal Martín Peña. The  channel connects the bay to other lagoons and the city of Río Piedras.

History

European conquest and settlement

The Spanish conquistadors of the New World thought in terms of urban landscapes and municipal organization. They did not launch their conquista de las Indias from ocean-going caravels or itinerant campsites. The Spanish needed solid dwellings, preferably surrounded by rock walls, as they had in Europe.  Juan Ponce de León spent days searching for the best place to build a villa, the blueprint for a colonial city. Santo Domingo governor Nicolás de Ovando had appointed him to pacify and evangelize the nearby island, which Christopher Columbus had named "San Juan Bautista" during his second voyage to the Americas. A frontier with dreaded, reportedly-cannibalistic Caribs on its coast, it was an opportunity to demonstrate machismo and glorify God and country. Following de Ovando's recommendation, Ferdinand II of Aragon made Ponce de León an adelantado and authorized him to conquer the Taíno island. Boriquén, the indigenous name for Puerto Rico, would be the second Caribbean island to become part of the Spanish Empire.

In 1508 Ponce de León sailed into the Bay of Guanica, on the west of the island, where local cacique Agüeybaná I welcomed his men as allies against the Caribs. However, the Spanish did not find a suitable place to settle there. The adelantado and his small team of hidalgos traversed the island until they saw a spacious, almost-landlocked bay on the northeastern shore. No indigenous peoples seemed to claim the area, since it was subject to Carib raids. Ponce de León named the body of water the Bay of the Wealthy Port.

Ponce de León pushed inland and ordered the first Spanish settlement on the island,  from the bay. Following de Ovando's suggestion, he named the settlement Caparra. The explorer chose the site because of its proximity to the sea and "to the gold mines and farms of the Toa Valley".

Caparra proved to be an inauspicious venture. Mendicant friars appealed to Ponce de León to move the settlement closer to the bay (and its sea breezes), saying that its present location was lethal to children. The governor was adamantly opposed, since he had had a house built in Caparra. In 1511 the crown appointed a new governor, Juan Cerón, who received royal permission to relocate the village. According to Rodrigo de Figueroa's map, the villagers resettled on a three-mile blustery, wooded islet at the bay's entrance. In 1521, the residents completed the resettlement and named the new village "Villa de Puerto Rico". Several years later, after a royal upgrade, the settlement was renamed "Ciudad de Puerto Rico". Colonial engineers fortified the islet with walls and castles, connecting it to mainland Puerto Rico with the San Antonio Bridge, and it came to be known as "the walled city".

Sixteenth-century Spanish historian and indigenous activist Bartolomé de las Casas described the bay and its surrounding area names different from those presently used: La isla que llamamos de San Juan, que por vocablo de la lengua de los indios, vecinos naturales della, se nombraba Boriquén ... tiene algunos puertos no buenos, si no es el que llaman Puerto-Rico ("That island we call San Juan, which according to the native Indian language was called Boriquén, has but a few inferior harbors, except the one called Puerto-Rico"). According to de las Casas, the Indians called their island "Boriquén"; the Spanish called it "San Juan", and its harbor "Puerto Rico". Over time, the island became Puerto Rico and its harbor (and bay) San Juan; the Indian name changed to Borinquen, with no diacritic and an extra n.

Colonial period
Although the Atlantic winds may have provided a healthier climate on the islet, moving the village from Caparra to the bay did not protect the settlers further from Carib attacks. The Caribs, understanding the impact of European colonization on their survival, stormed the new settlement fiercely.

By the eighteenth century the population of the islet had expanded into the Atlantic City of San Juan, largely due to the proximity of the bay and its port.  The city and the bay's entrances were fortified; the bay and its walls isolated the Spanish inhabitants from the rest of the island's population, encouraging a casta.

For the last 500 years the bay's most important function has been to link Puerto Rico and the outside world, and detachments of the Spanish treasure fleet connected the island colony to the Spanish colonial network. With its strategic location, it was a target for pirate attacks and a site for imperial powers to demonstrate military might. On the east side of the bay's mouth, the Castillo San Felipe del Morro still guards its narrow entrance.

Present day

The Port of San Juan, on the islet at the bay's northern side, is among the busiest Caribbean ports. Thousands of fishermen ply the brackish waters where fresh water meets the sea. San Juan Bay's beauty and ecological diversity attracts tourism and a variety of recreational activities.

A result of exploitation, however, has been the degradation of a significant portion of the bay's natural resources; the area is also susceptible to seismic activity. A restoration project has returned the bay's water to "safe at contact" status and has integrated the city's renovated coastal infrastructure into the bay's shoreline.

Gallery

See also
 
 Battle of San Juan (1595)
 Fortín San Juan de la Cruz

Notes

References

External links

 San Juan National Historic Site
 Estuario de la Bahía de San Juan 
 PRFFrogui: Estuario de la bahía de San Juan 
 Casa Blanca: residencia de los decendientes de Juan Ponce de León, colonizador de Puerto Rico

Bays of Puerto Rico
Geography of San Juan, Puerto Rico